Mingginda or Minkin is an extinct Australian Aboriginal language, perhaps a language isolate, of northern Australia. It was spoken by the Mingin people in the area around Burketown, on the southern coast of the Gulf of Carpentaria, in an area that contains the headwaters of the Leichhardt River.

The classification of Minkin is uncertain, primarily due to a lack of data. It has been suggested that it may have been related to the Yiwaidjan or Tankic language families. Evans (1990) believes it has been demonstrated to be a Tankic language, more distant than the others are to each other; this is accepted in Bowern (2011).

Vocabulary
Minkin data reconstituted by Evans (1990):

{| class="wikitable sortable"
! gloss !! Minkin
|-
| man (Aboriginal) || ŋaRka (ŋařka)
|-
| 'the blacks' || yaŋ(k)ana; wampuRa; kOmu; miŋ(k)u
|-
| white man || piʈa; Takantana
|-
| young man || kulankali; wuRunta (wuɽunta)
|-
| boy, children || wuRaRa
|-
| baby (also 'little', 'younger brother') || piltʸinkuRa
|-
| girl || puLupuLa (puɭupuɭa)
|-
| woman || maku
|-
| old man || paʈiŋaRa
|-
| old woman || waʈikiRi (waʈikiři)
|-
| father || kEyatʸi
|-
| mother || kuntuŋu
|-
| sister || wuŋ(k)uRa-paŋa; yilulaŋa
|-
| brother, elder || Naŋkalʸ or Naŋkay
|-
| brother, younger || piRtʸinkuRa
|-
| mother's mother || TiTila
|-
| God || tʸORpuyu
|-
| ghosts || paʈa
|-
| 'being who taught them everything' || kuwaRi
|-
| head || wiʈa
|-
| hair of head || puLumpa
|-
| hair of beard, beard || yaRinʸa, yaRiŋa
|-
| eye || mitʸELa
|-
| ear || maRa (mařa)
|-
| mouth || paRka
|-
| teeth || liya
|-
| tongue || THalŋa ~ THanŋa
|-
| nose || kiwiRa
|-
| face || yiRa
|-
| neck || panTaLmaRa
|-
| shoulder || tʸaʈa
|-
| breasts, milk || ŋukula
|-
| back || kOnTa (kanta)
|-
| stomach || paʈaka; puLtʸi
|-
| chest || payuLa
|-
| thigh || piLpa; t̪anpa
|-
| leg || tʸila
|-
| ankle || mukuLa
|-
| foot || tʸaŋ(k)a
|-
| track of a foot || tʸaŋ(k)ay, tʸaNa
|-
| arm || waLERa
|-
| wrist || muni-muni; maNay-maNay
|-
| hand || ŋaRŋaRa (ŋařŋařa)
|-
| fingers || ŋařa
|-
| skin || pakuRu
|-
| bone || TimERa (ʈimiřa)
|-
| blood || takana
|-
| fat || paRaŋ(k)a (paɽaŋka)
|-
| bowels, excrement || TORa (ʈuRa)
|-
| excrement || malina
|-
| kangaroo || punkana; tʸaku-tʸaku
|-
| possum || wapuRa
|-
| tame dog || kutu
|-
| wild dog, dingo || mitʸilpaRa
|-
| emu || puLanʸtʸana
|-
| black duck || piyanʸtʸuRa
|-
| wood duck || yapiRa- muntunʸtʸiRa
|-
| pelican || yukuTaRa; pitiltu
|-
| laughing jackass (kookaburra) || TalkuRa (t̪alkuřa)
|-
| native companion (brolga) || Tila-TalkuRa; puRalku
|-
| white cockatoo || TayalpuwaRa; kaRimpala
|-
| crow || waŋkuLa
|-
| swan || kunankuta
|-
| wild turkey || piRinkuRa
|-
| egg || yapipa
|-
| snake || palaŋ(k)aRa; pakanpapa
|-
| fish || waRa
|-
| crayfish || miNTuLa
|-
| mosquito || kalaRaŋ(k)a (kalařaŋka)
|-
| fly || wuŋaRa; kuRiNa
|-
| grass || kOɳa (kaɳa); puLpa
|-
| bark || kuRumpa; pakuRu
|-
| wood || wiLa; wiLaTaLOnti (wiLa t̪alunti)
|-
| war-spear || waRinwaRina; maLtʸiNTaRa
|-
| reed-spear || waRin; ŋuRmi (ŋuřmi)
|-
| woomera || piRi (piři)
|-
| shield || Taʈuna; tʸaRpi (tʸařpi)
|-
| tomahawk || THaʈiyapina; tʸaRiwiNTila
|-
| boomerang || waŋila
|-
| carvings on boomerang || waLitʸi
|-
| canoe || kamiRa
|-
| camp || NETa (ɳat̪a) (ŋita)
|-
| fire || wiLa
|-
| heat || yaLuLu (yalulu); mawuRina
|-
| smoke || Tumpuɳa; kuya-kuya
|-
| light || NawaNawa; kawuntuNaRay
|-
| dark (= night) || kawuNTi
|-
| water, rain || wat̪a
|-
| food || La(R)kuLa
|-
| honey (= fat) || paRaŋ(k)a (paɽaŋka)
|-
| thirsty || NVRmuNTu (ŋawaRmuNTu)
|-
| hungry || NaLu
|-
| stone, hill || kapaʈa
|-
| ground || kuʈa
|-
| river || kaTaRa (kat̪ařa)
|-
| lake, lagoon || paNka
|-
| swamp || wuɭpa
|-
| sea || mawORa
|-
| sun || tʸiRiŋaŋa
|-
| moon || palaŋatʸi
|-
| moon; star (?) || piRiŋ(k)a (piɽiŋka)
|-
| star; sky (?) || TaLaLa (ʈalala)
|-
| thunder || piʈimaRa(-Ta)
|-
| wind || waRmaRa (wařmaɽa)
|-
| rain || puLuLaŋ(k)ana
|-
| day || palmanmaLamaLa; yiɳanʸtʸi
|-
| today || yanaNiŋ(k)a, yanaLiŋ(k)a
|-
| night || miLimaʈa; kawuNTi
|-
| yesterday || kawuNTiwa; yaluNTay
|-
| dawn || ŋaNaRaNa, yuNaRaNa
|-
| tomorrow || kawuNTu, kawuNTuŋ(k)aRa
|-
| by-and-by || kiTaNTa ŋatʸa
|-
| cold || KuRiNa (ŋuřina)
|-
| good || puRuka
|-
| bad || TuRka
|-
| big || puLaNa; kuNamiRa (kunʸamiřa)
|-
| little; baby || piltʸinkuRa
|-
| dead, rotten || pukayaNa, puka
|-
| sweet || kaRaLkaRaLa
|-
| one || tʸuwaRnʸu ~ tʸuwaLnʸu
|-
| two || Tikinʸa
|-
| three || Tantʸilta
|-
| four || Tikintalʸu- TuwaLʸu, TikintʸaLinʸa
|-
| plenty, many || yunkuna; wan(a)puRa
|-
| none, no || wiɳiŋa; Wawiŋa
|-
| any || waNTini
|-
| some || tʸiliŋa
|-
| same || man̪t̪anʸi
|-
| other || tʸawuNiliŋa
|-
| to walk || yaNkiya
|-
| to walk, go || yapu
|-
| to run || Taŋanʸi
|-
| to go away || tʸawuyu
|-
| to come here || ŋatʸa
|-
| to sit || Ninʸa; kuNuyu
|-
| to take || kawapa
|-
| to hold || niŋapa
|-
| to let him go || yiɭayaNkipa
|-
| to give || wuNapa
|-
| to burn with fire || Nalapa
|-
| to make || piʈimapa
|-
| to sleep || yuŋ(k)uyu
|-
| to die || yuRpiyu
|-
| to live || piRitʸinʸa
|-
| to eat || TayaTaya,  TaRa
|-
| to drink || WawunTini
|-
| to speak || watʸi
|-
| to see || Nawapa
|-
| to feel || (yu)wiŋapa
|-
| to hear || (yu)wiŋʸtʸin- ta(R)watʸiNa
|-
| to know || mitʸil-maRa
|-
| yes || Niya (ŋiya)
|-
| 'Name of a place where the being camped' || maalpay or maalpi
|-
| Marriage class A (male) || LiyaRaNu
|-
| Marriage class C (female, marries A) || kaŋila
|-
| Marriage class B (male, marries D) || kayaLOLa
|-
| Marriage class D (female, marries B) || ŋařitʸpalaŋi
|-
| Where are the blacks? || TaɳaŋaRa komu?; TaɳaŋaRa miŋ(k)u
|-
| I don't know. || waNTaŋ Naŋ(k)i kuʈa; waNTaŋ Nanʸtʸi kuʈa
|}

References

Tangkic languages
Extinct languages of Queensland
Language isolates of Australia